The Music for the Requiem Mass is any music that accompanies the Requiem, a Mass in the Catholic Church for the deceased. It has inspired a large number of compositions, including settings by Mozart, Berlioz, Donizetti, Verdi, Bruckner, Dvořák, Fauré and Duruflé. Originally, such compositions were meant to be performed in liturgical service, with monophonic chant. Eventually the dramatic character of the text began to appeal to composers to an extent that they made the requiem a genre of its own, and the compositions of composers such as Verdi are essentially concert pieces rather than liturgical works.

Common texts

The following are the texts that have been set to music. Note that the Libera Me and the In Paradisum are not part of the text of the Catholic Mass for the Dead itself, but a part of the burial rite that immediately follows. In Paradisum was traditionally said or sung as the body left the church, and the Libera Me is said/sung at the burial site before interment. These became included in musical settings of the Requiem in the 19th century as composers began to treat the form more liberally.

Introit
From 4 Esdras 2:34–35; Psalm 65:1-2

Requiem æternam dona eis, Domine:
et lux perpetua luceat eis.
Te decet hymnus, Deus, in Sion,
et tibi reddetur votum in Ierusalem:
exaudi orationem meam,
ad te omnis caro veniet.
Requiem æternam dona eis, Domine:
et lux perpetua luceat eis.

Eternal rest give unto them, O Lord,
and let perpetual light shine upon them.
A hymn, O God, becometh Thee in Zion;
and a vow shall be paid to Thee in Jerusalem:
hear my prayer;
all flesh shall come to Thee.
Eternal rest give unto them, O Lord,
and let perpetual light shine upon them.

Kyrie eleison
This is as the Kyrie in the Ordinary of the Mass:

Kyrie, eleison.
Christe, eleison.
Kyrie, eleison.

Lord, have mercy.
Christ, have mercy.
Lord, have mercy.

This is Greek (Κύριε ἐλέησον, Χριστὲ ἐλέησον, Κύριε ἐλέησον). Each utterance is sung three times, though sometimes that is not the case when sung polyphonically.

Gradual
From 4 Esdras 2:34–35; Psalm 112:6

Requiem æternam dona eis, Domine:
et lux perpetua luceat eis.
In memoria æterna erit iustus:
ab auditione mala non timebit.

Eternal rest give unto them, O Lord;
and let perpetual light shine upon them.
The just shall be in everlasting remembrance;
he shall not fear the evil hearing.

Tract

Absolve, Domine,
animas omnium fidelium defunctorum
ab omni vinculo delictorum.
Et gratia tua illis succurrente,
mereantur evadere iudicium ultionis.
Et lucis æternae beatitudine perfrui.

Absolve, O Lord,
the souls of all the faithful departed
from every bond of sin.
And by the help of Thy grace
may they be enabled to escape the avenging judgment.
And enjoy the bliss of everlasting light.

Sequence

A sequence is a liturgical poem sung, when used, after the Tract (or Alleluia, if present).  The sequence employed in the Requiem, Dies irae, attributed to Thomas of Celano (c. 1200 – c. 1260–1270), has been called "the greatest of hymns", worthy of "supreme admiration".  The Latin text is included in the Requiem Mass in the 1962 Roman Missal. An early English version was translated by William Josiah Irons in 1849.

Offertory

Domine Iesu Christe, Rex gloriæ,
libera animas omnium fidelium defunctorum
de pœnis inferni et de profundo lacu:
libera eas de ore leonis,
ne absorbeat eas tartarus,
ne cadant in obscurum:
sed signifer sanctus Michael
repræsentet eas in lucem sanctam:
Quam olim Abrahæ promisisti, et semini eius.

Lord Jesus Christ, King of glory,
deliver the souls of all the faithful departed
from the pains of hell and from the bottomless pit:
deliver them from the lion's mouth,
that hell swallow them not up,
that they fall not into darkness,
but let the standard-bearer holy Michael
lead them into that holy light:
Which Thou didst promise of old to Abraham and to his seed.

Hostias et preces tibi, Domine,
laudis offerimus:
tu suscipe pro animabus illis,
quarum hodie memoriam facimus:
fac eas, Domine, de morte transire ad vitam.
Quam olim Abrahæ promisisti, et semini eius.

We offer to Thee, O Lord,
sacrifices and prayers:
do Thou receive them in behalf of those souls
of whom we make memorial this day.
Grant them, O Lord, to pass from death to that life,
Which Thou didst promise of old to Abraham and to his seed.

Sanctus
This is as the Sanctus prayer in the Ordinary of the Mass:

Sanctus, Sanctus, Sanctus
Dominus Deus Sabaoth.
Pleni sunt cæli et terra gloria tua.
Hosanna in excelsis.

Benedictus qui venit in nomine Domini.
Hosanna in excelsis.

Holy, holy, holy,
Lord God of Hosts.
Heaven and earth are full of Thy glory.
Hosanna in the highest.

Blessed is He Who cometh in the Name of the Lord.
Hosanna in the highest.

Agnus Dei
This is as the Agnus Dei in the Ordinary of the Mass, but with the petitions miserere nobis changed to dona eis requiem, and dona nobis pacem to dona eis requiem sempiternam:

Lux æterna

Lux æterna luceat eis, Domine:
Cum Sanctis tuis in æternum:
quia pius es.
Requiem æternam dona eis, Domine:
et lux perpetua luceat eis.
Cum Sanctis tuis in æternum:
 quia pius es.

May light eternal shine upon them, O Lord,
with Thy Saints for evermore:
for Thou art gracious.
Eternal rest give to them, O Lord,
and let perpetual light shine upon them:
With Thy Saints for evermore,
for Thou art gracious.

As mentioned above, there is no Gloria, Alleluia or Credo in these musical settings.

Pie Jesu

Some extracts too have been set independently to music, such as Pie Jesu in the settings of Dvořák, Fauré, Duruflé and John Rutter.

The Pie Jesu consists of the final words of the Dies irae followed by the final words of the Agnus Dei.

Pie Jesu Domine, dona eis requiem.
Dona eis requiem sempiternam.

 Merciful Lord Jesus, grant them rest;
 grant them eternal rest.

Musical Requiem settings sometimes include passages from the "Absolution at the bier" (Absolutio ad feretrum) or "Commendation of the dead person" (referred to also as the Absolution of the dead), which in the case of a funeral, follows the conclusion of the Mass.

Libera me

Libera me, Domine, de morte æterna, in die illa tremenda:
Quando cæli movendi sunt et terra:
Dum veneris iudicare sæculum per ignem.
Tremens factus sum ego, et timeo, dum discussio venerit, atque ventura ira.
Quando cæli movendi sunt et terra.
Dies illa, dies iræ, calamitatis et miseriæ, dies magna et amara valde.
Dum veneris iudicare sæculum per ignem.
Requiem æternam dona eis, Domine: et lux perpetua luceat eis.

 Deliver me, O Lord, from death eternal in that awful day.
 When the heavens and the earth shall be moved:
 When Thou shalt come to judge the world by fire.
 Dread and trembling have laid hold on me, and I fear exceedingly because of the judgment and of the wrath to come.
 When the heavens and the earth shall be moved.
 O that day, that day of wrath, of sore distress and of all wretchedness, that great day and exceeding bitter.
 When Thou shalt come to judge the world by fire.
 Eternal rest grant unto them, O Lord, and let perpetual light shine upon them.

In paradisum

In paradisum deducant te Angeli:
in tuo adventu suscipiant te Martyres,
et perducant te in civitatem sanctam Jerusalem.
Chorus Angelorum te suscipiat,
et cum Lazaro quondam paupere æternam habeas requiem.

 May the Angels lead thee into paradise:
 may the Martyrs receive thee at thy coming,
 and lead thee into the holy city of Jerusalem. 
 May the choir of Angels receive thee,
 and with Lazarus, who once was poor, mayest thou have eternal rest.

History of musical compositions
For many centuries the texts of the requiem were sung to Gregorian melodies. The Requiem by Johannes Ockeghem, written sometime in the later half of the 15th century, is the earliest surviving polyphonic setting. There was a setting by the elder composer Dufay, possibly earlier, which is now lost: Ockeghem's may have been modelled on it. Many early compositions employ different texts that were in use in different liturgies around Europe before the Council of Trent set down the texts given above. The requiem of Brumel, circa 1500, is the first to include the Dies Iræ. In the early polyphonic settings of the Requiem, there is considerable textural contrast within the compositions themselves: simple chordal or fauxbourdon-like passages are contrasted with other sections of contrapuntal complexity, such as in the Offertory of Ockeghem's Requiem.

In the 16th century, more and more composers set the Requiem mass. In contrast to practice in setting the Mass Ordinary, many of these settings used a cantus-firmus technique, something which had become quite archaic by mid-century. In addition, these settings used less textural contrast than the early settings by Ockeghem and Brumel, although the vocal scoring was often richer, for example in the six-voice Requiem by Jean Richafort which he wrote for the death of Josquin des Prez. Other composers before 1550 include Pedro de Escobar, Antoine de Févin, Cristóbal Morales, and Pierre de La Rue; that by La Rue is probably the second oldest, after Ockeghem's.

Over 2,000 Requiem compositions have been composed to the present day. Typically the Renaissance settings, especially those not written on the Iberian Peninsula, may be performed a cappella (i.e. without necessary accompanying instrumental parts), whereas beginning around 1600 composers more often preferred to use instruments to accompany a choir, and also include vocal soloists. There is great variation between compositions in how much of liturgical text is set to music.

Most composers omit sections of the liturgical prescription, most frequently the Gradual and the Tract. Fauré omits the Dies iræ, while the very same text had often been set by French composers in previous centuries as a stand-alone work.

Sometimes composers divide an item of the liturgical text into two or more movements; because of the length of its text, the Dies iræ is the most frequently divided section of the text (as with Mozart, for instance). The Introit and Kyrie, being immediately adjacent in the actual Roman Catholic liturgy, are often composed as one movement.

Musico-thematic relationships among movements within a Requiem can be found as well.

Requiem in concert
Beginning in the 18th century and continuing through the 19th, many composers wrote what are effectively concert works, which by virtue of employing forces too large, or lasting such a considerable duration, prevent them being readily used in an ordinary funeral service; the requiems of Gossec, Berlioz, Verdi, and Dvořák are essentially dramatic concert oratorios. A counter-reaction to this tendency came from the Cecilian movement, which recommended restrained accompaniment for liturgical music, and frowned upon the use of operatic vocal soloists.

Notable compositions

Many composers have composed a Requiem. Some of the most notable include the following (in chronological order):
 Ockeghem: Requiem, the earliest to survive, written in the mid-to-late 15th century
 Morales: Two notable requiems: Officium defunctorum (ca. 1526–28) and Missa pro defunctis (1544).
 Guerrero: Requiem (Missa pro defunctis), 1582.
 Victoria: Requiem of 1603 (part of a longer Office for the Dead)
 Zelenka:  Requiem in D Minor ZWV 48 After Augustus the Strong Circa 1730
 Mozart: Requiem, K. 626 (1791: Mozart died before its completion; Franz Xaver Süssmayr's completion is often used)
 Salieri: Requiem (1804) (played at his funeral on May 7, 1825)
 Cherubini: Requiem in C minor (1815) and Requiem in D minor (1836) 
 Berlioz: Grande Messe des morts (1837)

 Verdi: Messa da Requiem (1874)
 Saint-Saëns: Messe de Requiem (1878)
 Dvořák: Requiem, Op. 89 (1890)
 Fauré: Requiem, Op. 48 (1890)
 Delius: Requiem (1916)
 Duruflé: Requiem, Op. 9, based almost exclusively on the chants from the Graduale Romanum (1947)
 Britten: War Requiem, Op. 66, which incorporated poems by Wilfred Owen (1962)
 Stravinsky: Requiem Canticles (1966)

 Penderecki: Polish Requiem (1984, revised 1993 and 2005)
 Lloyd Webber: Requiem (1985)
 Rutter: Requiem, includes Psalm 130, Psalm 23 and words from the Book of Common Prayer (1985)

Other composers

Renaissance
 Giovanni Francesco Anerio
 Gianmatteo Asola
 Giulio Belli
 Antoine Brumel
 Manuel Cardoso
 Giovanni Cavaccio
 Joan Cererols
 Pierre Certon
 Clemens non Papa
 Guillaume Dufay (lost)
 Pedro de Escobar
 Antoine de Févin
 Francisco Guerrero
 Jacobus de Kerle
 Orlande de Lassus
 Duarte Lobo
 Jean Maillard
 Jacques Mauduit
 Manuel Mendes
 Cristóbal de Morales
 Johannes Ockeghem (the earliest to survive)
 Giovanni Pierluigi da Palestrina
 Pietro Pontio (2 for four voices—both incomplete—and one for five low voices)
 Costanzo Porta
 Johannes Prioris
 Jean Richafort
 Pedro Rimonte
 Pierre de la Rue
 Claudin de Sermisy
 Jacobus Vaet
 Tomás Luis de Victoria

Baroque
 Giovanni Francesco Anerio
 Heinrich Ignaz Franz von Biber
 André Campra
 Marc-Antoine Charpentier
 Johann Joseph Fux
 Jean Gilles
 Antonio Lotti (Requiem in F Major)
 Benedetto Marcello (Requiem in the Venetian Manner)
 Claudio Monteverdi (lost)
 Michael Praetorius
 Heinrich Schütz
 Andrzej Siewiński
 Jan Dismas Zelenka

Classical period
 Johann Georg Albrechtsberger
 Franz Joseph Aumann
 Luigi Cherubini
 Domenico Cimarosa (1787)
 Carl Ditters von Dittersdorf
 Joseph Leopold Eybler
 Florian Leopold Gassmann
 François-Joseph Gossec
 Johann Adolf Hasse
 Michael Haydn
 Amandus Ivanschiz
 Georg von Pasterwitz
 Joseph Martin Kraus
 Andrea Lucchesi
 Giovanni Battista Martini
 Wolfgang Amadeus Mozart (1791)
 José Maurício Nunes Garcia
 Ignaz Pleyel
 Antonio Salieri
 Václav Tomášek
 Osip Kozlovsky

Romantic era
 Hector Berlioz (1837)
 João Domingos Bomtempo
 Johannes Brahms (1865–68)
 Anton Bruckner, Requiem in D minor
 Ferruccio Busoni
 Carl Czerny
 Gaetano Donizetti: Requiem in D minor (for Bellini)
 Antonín Dvořák
 Gabriel Fauré
 Charles Gounod
 Asger Hamerik
 Franz Lachner
 Franz Liszt
 Giacomo Puccini [Introit only]
 Max Reger, Hebbel Requiem, Lateinisches Requiem (fragment)
 Antonín Rejcha
 Robert Schumann
 Franz von Suppé (1855)
 Charles Villiers Stanford
 Giuseppe Verdi (1874)
 Richard Wetz
 See also: Messa per Rossini

20th century
 Julius Fučík (composer) (1915)
 Mark Alburger
 Malcolm Archer
 Vyacheslav Artyomov
 John Baboukis’s Requiem Mass for G.K. Chesterton (1986)
 Osvaldas Balakauskas
 Benjamin Britten
 Gavin Bryars
 Sylvano Bussotti's "Rara Requiem" (1969)
 Michel Chion
 Vladimir Dashkevich
 Stephen DeCesare's "Requiem"
 James DeMars: An American Requiem
 Edison Denisov
 Alfred Desenclos (1963)
 Felix Draeseke (1910)
 Ralph Dunstan
 Maurice Duruflé
 Lorenzo Ferrero's Introito, part of the Requiem per le vittime della mafia
 Gerald Finzi's Requiem da camera
 John Foulds "A World Requiem"
 Howard Goodall's "Eternal Light: A Requiem"
 Sandro Gorli's Requiem
 William Harper "Requiem"
 Hans Werner Henze
 Frigyes Hidas
 Herbert Howells
 Sigurd Islandsmoen
 Karl Jenkins
 Dmitry Kabalevsky (1962)
 Volker David Kirchner
 Ståle Kleiberg
 Joonas Kokkonen
 Cyrillus Kreek
 Huub de Lange
 Morten Lauridsen "Lux Aeterna"
 Philip Ledger
 Kamilló Lendvay
 György Ligeti (1965)
 Nils Lindberg
 Andrew Lloyd Webber
 Fernando Lopes-Graça
 Roman Maciejewski
 Bruno Maderna (1946)
 Frank Martin Requiem (1972)
 Jean-Christian Michel
 Otto Olsson (1903)
 Ildebrando Pizzetti (1968)
 Jocelyn Pook
 Zbigniew Preisner "Requiem for My Friend (Preisner)"
 Aaron Robinson: "An American Requiem" (1997)
 John Rutter (1985)
 Joseph Ryelandt
 Shigeaki Saegusa
 Alfred Schnittke
 Giovanni Sgambati (1901)
 Valentin Silvestrov
 Fredrik Sixten
 Robert Steadman
 Igor Stravinsky
 Toru Takemitsu
 John Tavener
 Mikis Theodorakis
 Virgil Thomson
 Erkki-Sven Tüür
 Malcolm Williamson
 Bernd Alois Zimmermann:  (1969)

21st century
 John Starr Alexander "Requiem" (2001)
 Kim André Arnesen "Requiem" (2013-2014)
 Lera Auerbach "Russian Requiem"
 Leonardo Balada "No-res (Nothing) - An Agnostic Requiem"
 Troy Banarzi "Requiem for the Missing" (2009)
 Virgin Black "Requiem Trilogy"
 Jamie Brown "A Cornish Requiem / Requiem Kernewek"
 Gavin Bryars "Cadman Requiem"
 Paul Carr "Requiem for an Angel"
 Bob Chilcott
 Richard Danielpour "An American Requiem" (2001)
 Stephen DeCesare "Missa De Profunctis"
 Bradley Ellingboe
 Mohammed Fairouz "Requiem Mass"
 Dan Forrest: Requiem for the Living (2013)
 Eliza Gilkyson, arr. by Craig Hella Johnson "Requiem" 
 Howard Goodall "Eternal Light: A Requiem" (2008)
 Steve Gray "Requiem For Choir and Big Band"
 Roman Grygoriv and Illia Razumeiko IYOV, opera-requiem for prepared piano, cello, drums and voices (2015)
 John Harbison: Requiem (2002)
 Patrick Hawes "Lazarus Requiem"
 Tyzen Hsiao "Ilha Formosa: Requiem for Formosa's Martyrs"
 Karl Jenkins "Requiem" (2004)
 Rami Khalifé "Requiem for Beirut" (2013)
 Iver Kleive
 Fan-Long Ko "2-28 Requiem" (2008)
 Thierry Lancino
 György Ligeti "Requiem" (2006)
 Christopher Rouse
 Carl Rütti "Requiem" (2007)
 Kentaro Sato
 Mattias Sköld "Requiem" (2007)
 Somtow Sucharitkul
 John Tavener "A Celtic Requiem" (1969) / "Requiem" (2008)
 Chris Williams "Tsunami Requiem"
 Mack Wilberg
 David Crowder Band "Give Us Rest"
 António Pinho Vargas
 Ehsan Saboohi "Phonemes Requiem" (2014-2015)
 Gabriela Lena Frank "Conquest Requiem" (2017)
 Ashley Bryan: "A Tender Bridge"
 Anlun Huang"Requiem" (2004)
 Xia Guan"Earth Requiem" (2009)
 Marc L. Vogler "Requiem Covid-19" (2020)

Requiem by language (other than Latin)
English with Latin
 Benjamin Britten: War Requiem
 Richard Danielpour: An American Requiem
 Howard Goodall: "Eternal Light"
 Patrick Hawes "Lazarus Requiem"
 Paul Hindemith: When lilacs last in the dooryard bloom'd: A Requiem for those we love
 Herbert Howells
 John Rutter: Requiem
 Fredrik Sixten
 Sir Henry Walford Davies "A Short Requiem" (1915) 'In Sacred Memory of all those who have fallen in the war'
 Somtow Sucharitkul
 Mack Wilberg
 Aaron Robinson: "A Tender Bridge - An African American Requiem" (2018)

Cornish
 Jamie Brown: A Cornish Requiem / Requiem Kernewek

Estonian
 Cyrillus Kreek: Estonian Requiem

German
 Johannes Brahms: Ein deutsches Requiem
 Michael Praetorius
 Max Reger, Hebbel Requiem
 Franz Schubert
 Heinrich Schütz

French, Greek, with Latin
Thierry Lancino

French, English, German with Latin
 Edison Denisov
 Jacques Hiver

Latin and Japanese
 Karl Jenkins: Requiem
 Hina Sakamoto: REQUIEM For the spirits of the victims of the Pacific War

Latin and German and others
 Bernd Alois Zimmermann: Requiem für einen jungen Dichter

Latin and Polish
 Krzysztof Penderecki: Polish Requiem Zbigniew Preisner: Requiem for my friendLatin and 7th Century Northumbrian
 Gavin Bryars Cadman RequiemRussian
 Lera Auerbach – Russian Requiem, on Russian Orthodox sacred text and poetry
 Vladimir Dashkevich – Requiem (Text by Anna Akhmatova)
 Elena Firsova – Requiem, Op.100 (Text by Anna Akhmatova)
 Dmitri Kabalevsky – War Requiem (Text by Robert Rozhdestvensky)
 Sergei Taneyev – Cantata John of Damascus, Op.1 (Text by Alexey Tolstoy)

Chinese
 Tyzen Hsiao – Ilha Formosa: Requiem for Formosa's Martyrs, 2001 (Text by Min-yung Lee, 1994)
 Fan-Long Ko – 2-28 Requiem, 2008. (Text by Li Kuei-Hsien)
 Anlun Huang – Requiem, 2004. (Text by Youzhi Tang)
 Xia Guan – Earth Requiem, 2009. (Text by Lin Liu, Xiaoming Song)

Persian
 Ehsan Saboohi – Phonemes Requiem (For four Soloists, mixed Chorus, Didgeridoo, prepared Tombak, Electronics, Computer)

Nonlinguistic
 Luciano Berio's Requies: in memoriam Benjamin Britten's Sinfonia da Requiem and Arthur Honegger's Symphonie Liturgique use titles from the traditional Requiem as subtitles of movements.
 Carlo Forlivesi – Requiem, for 8-channel tape
 Hans Werner Henze – Requiem (instrumental)
 Wojciech Kilar Requiem Father Kolbe
 Lansing McLoskey – Requiem, v.2.001 (versions for chamber sextet and orchestra)
 John Zorn – Missa Sine Voces (instrumental)

Modern treatments
In the 20th century the requiem evolved in several new directions. One offshoot consists of compositions dedicated to the memory of people killed in wartime. These often include extra-liturgical poems of a pacifist or non-liturgical nature; for example, the War Requiem of Benjamin Britten juxtaposes the Latin text with the poetry of Wilfred Owen, Krzysztof Penderecki's Polish Requiem includes a traditional Polish hymn within the sequence, and Robert Steadman's Mass in Black intersperses environmental poetry and prophecies of Nostradamus. Holocaust Requiem may be regarded as a specific subset of this type. The World Requiem of John Foulds was written in the aftermath of the First World War and initiated the Royal British Legion's annual festival of remembrance. Recent requiem works by Taiwanese composers Tyzen Hsiao and Fan-Long Ko follow in this tradition, honouring victims of the February 28 Incident and subsequent White Terror.

Lastly, the 20th century saw the development of the secular Requiem, written for public performance without specific religious observance, such as Frederick Delius's Requiem, completed in 1916 and dedicated to "the memory of all young Artists fallen in the war", and Dmitry Kabalevsky's Requiem (Op. 72 – 1962), a setting of a poem written by Robert Rozhdestvensky especially for the composition. Herbert Howells's unaccompanied Requiem uses Psalm 23 ("The Lord is my shepherd"), Psalm 121 ("I will lift up mine eyes"), "Salvator mundi" ("O Saviour of the world," in English), "Requiem aeternam" (two different settings), and "I heard a voice from heaven." Some composers have written purely instrumental works bearing the title of requiem, as famously exemplified by Britten's Sinfonia da Requiem. Hans Werner Henze's Das Floß der Medusa, written in 1968 as a requiem for Che Guevara, is properly speaking an oratorio; Henze's Requiem is instrumental but retains the traditional Latin titles for the movements. Igor Stravinsky's Requiem Canticles'' mixes instrumental movements with segments of the "Introit," "Dies irae," "Pie Jesu," and "Libera me."

See also

 Church music
 Mass (music)
 Oratorio
 Vocal music

References

External links
 Mozart's "Requiem". Spanish Radio and Television Symphony Orchestra and Chorus. Carlos Kalmar, conductor. Live concert with the completion of its well-known unfinished musical score of the musicologist Robert Levin.
 Fauré's "Requiem". Spanish Radio and Television Symphony Orchestra and Chorus. Petri Sakari, conductor. Live concert.
 Dvořák's "Requiem". Spanish Radio and Television Symphony Orchestra and Chorus. Carlos Kalmar, conductor. Live concert. Los conciertos de La 2 - Concierto RTVE A-5 - RTVE.es
 http://www.rtve.es/alacarta/videos/los-conciertos-de-la-2/conciertos-2-concierto-rtve-5/2258548/ Dvořák's "Requiem".] Spanish Radio and Television Symphony Orchestra and Chorus. Carlos Kalmar, conductor. Live concert. Los conciertos de La 2 - Concierto RTVE A-5 - RTVE.es
 Lansing McLoskey's "Requiem, v.2.001". Stony Brook Contemporary Chamber Players. Eduardo Leandro, conductor. (Albany Records, 2013).
 Lansing McLoskey's "Requiem, v.2.001". What Is Noise ensemble. (Centaur Records, 2018).